The Ministry of Women, Children and Senior Citizens is a governmental body of Nepal. Its mission is to empower women, children and senior citizens, especially those who are economically disadvantaged, socially deprived or otherwise under-served.

Organisational structure
The Ministry of Women, Children and Senior Citizens have several departments, and subdivisions to facilitate and implement its work:
 The Department of Women and Children
 The Central Child Welfare Board
 The Social Welfare Council

Ministers 
This is a list of former Ministers of The Ministry of Women, Children and Senior Citizens (or its equivalent) since the Nepalese Constituent Assembly election in 2013:

References

Women, Children and Senior Citizen
Nepal
Women in Nepal
Women's rights in Nepal